Cardinham Grange was a monastic grange in Cardinham, Cornwall, UK. Lady Vale Chapel was given soon after the Norman Conquest by Richard Fitz Turold to the Abbey of St Mary de Valle near Bayeux intending that a cell of monks should be established. The abbey, finding the property burdensome, induced Richard to transfer it to the monastery of Tywardreath which he was then founding. It was served by monks from Tywardreath until the dissolution of the monasteries when the property was granted to the Duchy of Cornwall.

References

Monasteries in Cornwall